The 1984 Las Vegas AT&T Challenge of Champions was a tennis tournament held in 1984 at the Thomas & Mack Center in Paradise, Nevada. It was won by John McEnroe, 7–5, 6–0 against Guillermo Vilas.

Players

Draw

Finals

Group A

Group B

Standings were determined by: 1) A points system, with players receiving 1 point for each set won, and a further 1 point for each match won; and 2) In two-player ties, head-to-head records. The players finishing in 1st place in each group reach the final, while the players finishing in 2nd place progressed into a 3rd place match.

References

Las Vegas AT&T Challenge of Champions
Las Vegas AT&T Challenge of Champions
Las